The 2020 Oregon House of Representatives election were held on Tuesday, November 3, 2020, with the primary election being held on May 19, 2020. Voters in the 60 districts of the Oregon House of Representatives elected their representatives. The elections coincided with the elections for other offices, including for the Oregon State Senate and for U.S. President.

The Democratic Party kept their majority. The Oregon Legislature does not have term limits.

Background 
Democrats have held the Oregon House since 2007 and the chamber was not considered competitive in 2020.

Electoral system 
The 60 members of the Oregon State House are elected from single-member districts by first-past-the-post voting to two-year terms. Contested nominations of the Democratic and Republican parties for each district were determined by an open primary election. Minor-party and independent candidates were nominated by petition and write-in candidates had to file a request with the Secretary of State's office for votes for them to be counted.

Predictions

Results summary

Close races
Districts where the margin of victory was under 10%:

Results by district

1st District

2nd District

3rd District

4th District

5th District

6th District

7th District

8th District

9th District

10th District

11th District

12th District

13th District

14th District

15th District

16th District

17th District

18th District

19th District

20th District

21st District

22nd District

23rd District

24th District

25th District

26th District

27th District

28th District

29th District

30th District

31st District

32nd District

33rd District

34th District

35th District

36th District

37th District

38th District

39th District

40th District

41st District

42nd District

43rd District

44th District

45th District

46th District

47th District

48th District

49th District

50th District

51st District

52nd District

53rd District

54th District

55th District

56th District

57th District

58th District

59th District

60th District

See also 

 2020 Oregon State Senate election

References

External links
 
 
  (State affiliate of the U.S. League of Women Voters)
 

House of Representatives
Oregon House
2020